Homshetsi is an archaic Western Armenian dialect spoken by the eastern and northern group of Hemshin peoples (Hemşinli), a people living in northeastern Turkey, Abkhazia, Russia, and Central Asia.

It has some differences from Armenian spoken in Armenia. It was not a written language until 1995, when linguist Bert Vaux designed an orthographic system for it based on the Turkish alphabet; the Armenian alphabet was used by Christian immigrants from Hamshen (Northern Hamshenis)—who refer to the language as Homshetsma (Հոմշեցմա) in Russia and Abkhazia.

Homshetsi is a spoken language amongst the Eastern Hemshinli, also known as the Hopa Hemshinli, who live in a small number of villages in Turkey's Artvin Province and Central Asia. The Western or Rize Hamsheni are a related, geographically separate group living in Rize Province, who spoke Homshetsi until sometime in the 19th century. They now speak only Turkish with many Homshetsi loanwords. A third group, the northern Homshentsik, who live in Russia, Georgia (Abkhazia), Armenia, also speak Homshetsi.

Homshetsi has linguistic features that indicate it belongs to the Western Armenian dialect group; however, the two are generally not mutually intelligible. Homshetsi has close ties to the Armenian dialects formerly found in northeastern Turkey, in particular in Khodorchur and, to a lesser extent, in Trabzon. Because of its extended isolation, Homshetsi contains many archaisms that set it apart from all other Armenian dialects. The language preserves forms found only in Classical and Middle Armenian, and at the same time preserves foreign (especially Arabic and Turkish) grammatical and lexical components that were stripped from modern Armenian during the twentieth century.

UNESCO has categorised Homshetsi as a language that is "definitely endangered".

References

Further reading
Berens, Sally Jacoba.1998. "The phonetics and phonology of Homshetsma." PhD diss., Harvard University.
Margaryan, Ashot, Ashot Harutyunyan, Zaruhi Khachatryan, Armine Khudoyan, and Levon Yepiskoposyan. 2012. "Paternal lineage analysis supports an Armenian rather than a Central Asian genetic origin of the *Hamshenis." Human Biology 84.4: 405–422.
Rezvani, Babak. 2010. "The Hemshin: History, Society and Identity in the Highlands of Northeast Turkey." Middle Eastern Studies 46.4:630–631.
Simonian, Hovann H. 2006. "History and identity among the Hemshin." Central Asian Survey 25, no. 1–2:157–178.
Vaux, Bert. 2012. “The Armenian dialect of Khodorjur”. Accessed February 21, 2014.
Vaux, Bert. 2007. "Homshetsma: The language of the Armenians of Hamshen." In The Hemshin: History, Society and Identity in the Highlands of Northeast Turkey, edited by H.H. Simonian. 257–278. London and New York: Routledge.
Vaux, Bert. 2001. "Hemshinli: The Forgotten Black Sea Armenians". Accessed 21, 2014.  
Vaux, Bert, Sergio LaPorta, and Emily Tucker. 1996. "Ethnographic Materials from the Muslim Hemshinli". Annals of Armenian Linguistics 17. Accessed February 21, 2014.

External links

Hemshin people
Armenian languages
Languages of Turkey
Languages of Abkhazia
Languages of Russia
Endangered Indo-European languages
Armenian dialects